This is a list of notable Azerbaijanis. Azerbaijanis, Azerbaijani Turks, or Azeris are a Turkic people, mostly living throughout Caucasus, northern Iran and eastern Turkey. Traditionally, Azerbaijanis live in Azerbaijan, Iran, Russia (Dagestan), Turkey (Kars and Iğdır) and Georgia (Borchali).

Azerbaijan

Aerospace 
 Tofig Ismayilov (1933–1991), aerospace scientist
 Kerim Kerimov (1917–2003), aerospace engineer
 Musa Manarov (born 1951), astronaut

Actors 

 Lutfali Abdullayev (1914–1973), actor
 Telman Adigozalov (1953–2010), actor
 Aliagha Aghayev (1913–1983), actor
 Alasgar Alakbarov (1910–1963), actor
 Mirzaagha Aliyev (1883–1954), actor
 Huseyn Arablinski (1881–1919), actor
 Sayavush Aslan (1935–2013), actor
 Mirza Babayev (1903–2003), actor and singer
 Shamsi Badalbeyli (1911–1986), theatre director and actor
 Leyla Badirbeyli (1920–1999), actress
 Hajibaba Baghirov (1932–2006), actor
 Bahram Bagirzade (born 1972), actor, entertainer, comedian and film director
 Rasim Balayev (born 1948), actor
 Afag Bashirgyzy (born 1955), actress
 Aghasadyg Garaybeyli (1897–1988), actor
 Hokuma Gurbanova (1913–1988), actress
 Nesrin Javadzadeh (born 1982), actress
 Munavvar Kalantarli (1912–1962), actress and folk singer
 Aygün Kazımova (born 1971), actress and singer
 Fakhraddin Manafov (born 1955), actor
 Jeyhun Mirzayev (1946–1993), actor and film director
 Yashar Nuri (1951–2012), actor
 Hamida Omarova (born 1957), actress
 Hagigat Rzayeva (1907–1969), actress and singer
 Latif Safarov (1920–1963), actor and film director
 Barat Shakinskaya (1914–1999), actress
 Abbas Mirza Sharifzadeh (1893–1938), actor and film director
 Rza Tahmasib (1894–1980), actor
 Hasanagha Turabov (1938–2003), actor
 Eldaniz Zeynalov (1937–2001), actor
 Nasiba Zeynalova (1916–2004), actress

Archaeologists and anthropologists 
 Jeyhun Hajibeyli (1891–1962), ethnographer and journalist
 Mammadali Huseynov (1922–1994), archaeologist
 Ishag Jafarzadeh (1895–1982), archaeologist and ethnographer

Architects 
 Sadig Dadashov (1905–1946), architect
 Gasim bey Hajibababeyov (1811–1874), architect
 Mammad Hasan Hajinski (1875–1931), architect and statesman
 Mikayil Huseynov (1905–1992), architect
 Karbalayi Safikhan Karabakhi (1817–1910), architect
 Kamal Mammadbeyov (1924–1997), architect

Artists 

 Mikail Abdullayev (1921–2002), painter
 Fuad Abdurahmanov (1915–1971), sculptor
 Azim Azimzade (1880–1943), painter and graphic artist and the founder of Azerbaijani satirical graphics
 Sattar Bahlulzadeh (1909–1974), impressionist painter
 Omar Eldarov (born 1927), sculptor
 Jalal Garyaghdi (1914–2001), sculptor
 Mirza Kadym Irevani (1835–1875), artist
 Bahruz Kangarli (1892–1922), painter, graphic artist and the founder of realistic easel painting of Azerbaijan
 Tokay Mammadov (1927–2018), sculptor
 Boyukagha Mirzazade (1921–2007), painter
 Rustam Mustafayev (1910–1940), scenic designer
 Togrul Narimanbekov (1930–2013), painter
 Vidadi Narimanbekov (1926–2001), painter
 Mir Mohsun Navvab (1833–1918), calligrapher, poet, artist, music historian, astronomer, carpenter, chemist and mathematician
 Maral Rahmanzade (1916–2008), graphic artist
 Alakbar Rezaguliyev (1903–1974), painter
 Tahir Salahov (1928–2021), painter
 Fuad Salayev (born 1943), sculptor

Broadcasters 
 Mirshahin Agayev (born 1963), TV presenter and journalist
 Leyla Aliyeva (born 1986), TV presenter
 Salatyn Asgarova (1961–1991), killed by Armenian militias
 Nargiz Birk-Petersen (born 1976), TV presenter
 Emin Efendi, TV presenter and record producer
 Chingiz Mustafayev (1960–1992), one of the most notable independent Azerbaijani journalists
 Sevinj Osmanqizi (born 1969), TV presenter, media personality, author and journalist

Businessmen 

 Aras Agalarov (born 1955), businessman
 Farkhad Akhmedov (born 1955), businessman
 Vagit Alekperov (born 1950), businessman
 Shamsi Asadullayev (1840–1913), industrial oil magnate and philanthropist
 Jahangir Hajiyev (born 1965), banker
 Telman Ismailov (born 1956), businessman
 Nigar Kocharli (born 1975), bookshop chain owner
 Hafiz Mammadov (born 1964), businessman
 Mubariz Mansimov (born 1968), businessman
 Murtuza Mukhtarov (1865–1920), industrial oil magnate and philanthropist
 Musa Nagiyev (1849–1919), industrial oil magnate and philanthropist
 God Nisanov (born 1972), businessman; the youngest Azerbaijani billionaire
 Haji Zeynalabdin Taghiyev (1823–1924), industrial oil magnate and philanthropist

Clergy 

 Ilgar Ibrahimoglu (born 1973), cleric and human rights activist
 Allahshukur Pashazadeh (born 1949), Sheikh ul-Islam and Grand Mufti of the Caucasus
 Movlazadeh Mahammad Hasan Shakavi (1854–1932), religious leader, philosopher, alim, the first Sheikh ul-Islam of the Caucasus, the first scholar who translated Quran into Azerbaijani language
 Sheikh Sardar Hajjihasanli
 Mirza Huseyn Afandi Qayibov (1830–1915), clergyman, literary critic, publicist, enlightener and Mufti of the Caucasus (1884-1917).
 Ahmad Huseinzadeh (1812–1887), third Sheikh ul-Islam of the Caucasus, son of Mahammadali Huseinzadeh, maternal uncle of Ali bey Huseynzade.
 Fazil Iravani (1783–1885), second Sheikh ul-Islam of the Caucasus.
 Mahammadali Huseinzadeh (1760–1852), first shia Sheikh ul-Islam of the Caucasus from 1823 to 1852. Maternal grandfather of Ali bey Huseynzade.

Dancers 
 Gamar Almaszadeh (1915–2006), first Azerbaijani ballerina
 Oksana Rasulova (born 1982), dancer, choreographer and actress
 Leyla Vakilova (1927–1999), ballerina

Fashion 
 Javidan Gurbanova (born 1990), model
 Aysel Manafova (born 1990), model

Film industry 
 Yuli Gusman (born 1943), film director
 Robert Hossein (1927–2020), film director and actor
 Magsud Ibrahimbeyov (1935–2016), writer
 Rustam Ibragimbekov (1939–2022), writer and screenwriter
 Elchin Musaoglu (born 1966), film director
 Vagif Mustafayev (born 1953), film director, producer and screenwriter
 Rasim Ojagov (1933–2006), film director and operator
 Hasan Seyidbeyli (1920–1980), film director, dramatist and screenwriter
 Rza Tahmasib (1894–1980), film director and actor

Historians 

 Igrar Aliyev (1924–2004), historian
 Sara Ashurbayli (1906–2001), historian, historian and scholar
 Abbasgulu Bakikhanov (1794–1847), writer, historian, journalist, linguist, poet, philosopher and founder of Azerbaijani scientific historiography
 Aydin Balayev (born 1956), historian
 Ziya Buniatov (1923–1997), historian and academician
 Jamil Hasanli (born 1952), historian and politician
 Mirza Jamal Javanshir (1773–1853), historian and politician
 Alexander Kazembek (1802–1870), orientalist, historian and philologist
 Tofig Kocharli (1929–2007), historian and politician
 Farida Mammadova (1936–2021), historian
 Mirza Adigozal bey (1780s–1840), historian of the 19th century, author of a historical work "Garabaghname"

Journalists 
 Hasan bey Aghayev (1875–1920), journalist, doctor, teacher and politician
 Salatyn Asgarova (1961–1991), journalist
 Elmar Huseynov (1967–2005), journalist
 Osman Mirzayev (1937–1991), journalist, writer and publicist
 Ali Mustafayev (1952–1991), journalist
 Chingiz Mustafayev (1960–1992), journalist, National Hero of Azerbaijan.
 Omar Faig Nemanzadeh (1872–1937), journalist

Military 

 Feyzullah Mirza Qajar (1872–1920), commander in the Azerbaijani Democratic Republic and Imperial Russian Army
 Mehdigulu Khan Vafa (1855–1900), lieutenant colonel in the Imperial Russian Army
 Jafargulu agha Javanshir (1787–1867), major-general of the Russian Army
 Safar Abiyev (born 1950), army general
 Albert Agarunov (1969–1992), tank commander
 Sadykh bey Aghabekov (1865–1944), army general in the Russian Imperial Army, founder and reformer of Azerbaijani Police and orientalist
 Riad Ahmadov (1956–1992), military officer
 Avraamy Aslanbegov (1822–1900), vice–admiral and military writer
 Hazi Aslanov (1910–1945), army general
 Allahverdi Bagirov (1946–1992), officer and football coach
 Farrukh Gayibov (1891–1916), first Azerbaijani military pilot during World War I
 Alif Hajiyev (1953–1992), officer
 Zakir Hasanov (born 1959), army general
 Fatulla Huseynov (1937–2004), colonel, politician and public figure
 Tofig Huseynov (1954–1992), major
 Mehdi Huseynzade (1918–1944), guerrilla fighter in Yugoslavia and Italy during World War II
 Mubariz Ibrahimov (1988–2010), warrant officer
 Ahmadiyya Jabrayilov (1920–1994), activist of French Resistance
 Rovshan Javadov (1951–1995), influential military activist, public figure
 Asif Maharramov (1952–1994), lieutenant colonel
 Leyla Mammadbeyova (1909–1989), first Azerbaijani female aviator and the first female pilot in Southern Europe and the Middle East
 Eldar Mammadov (1968–1993), officer
 Israfil Mammadov (1919–1946), military commander
 Samedbey Mehmandarov (1855–1931), army general and politician
 Hussein Khan Nakhichevanski (1855–1931), Cavalry General and General–Adjutant
 Jamshid Nakhichevanski (1863–1919), Russian Imperial, Azerbaijani and Soviet military commander
 Ali-Agha Shikhlinski (1895–1938), army general and politician
 Ibrahim bey Usubov (1872–1920), military commander
 Polad Hashimov (1975–2020), major general (2019), and National Hero of Azerbaijan
 Anar Aliyev (1980–2020), lieutenant colonel and Hero of the Patriotic War
 Hikmat Mirzayev, lieutenant general of the Azerbaijani Armed Forces, Commander of the Special Forces, participant of the 2016 Nagorno–Karabakh clashes and the 2020 Nagorno-Karabakh war, and the victor of the 2020 battle of Shusha. He had received the title of the Hero of the Patriotic War.
 Zakir Hasanov, Colonel General, Minister of Defence of Azerbaijan since 2013.
 Ramiz Jafarov (1974–2020), lieutenant colonel and Hero of the Patriotic War
 Tehran Mansimov, colonel and senior leader in the Special Forces.

Musicians

Composers 

 Franghiz Ali-Zadeh (born 1947), composer
 Fikret Amirov (1922–1984), composer
 Rafig Babayev (1937–1994), composer, jazz pianist and singer
 Afrasiyab Badalbeyli (1907–1976), composer, conductor and music critic; the author of music and the libretto of the first Azerbaijani Ballet and the first ballet in the Muslim East
 Tofig Bakikhanov (born 1930), composer
 Amina Figarova (born 1964), jazz composer and pianist
 Salman Gambarov (born 1959), composer and jazz pianist
 Gara Garayev (1918–1982), composer
 Tofig Guliyev (1917–2000), composer
 Soltan Hajibeyov (1919–1974), composer
 Uzeyir Hajibeyov (1885–1948), composer, conductor, scientist, publicist, playwright, teacher, translator, and social figure;  the first Muslim author of an opera
 Rauf Hajiyev (1922–1985), composer and politician
 Muslim Magomayev (1885–1937), composer, one of the founders of Azerbaijani classical music
 Arif Malikov (1933–2019), composer
 Eldar Mansurov (born 1952), composer
 Vagif Mustafazadeh (1940–1979), composer and jazz pianist and the founder of Azerbaijani jazz
 Emin Sabitoglu (1937–2000), composer, music editor
 Ali Salimi (1922–1997), composer and tar player
 Alakbar Taghiyev (1922–1981), composer
 Aziza Mustafa Zadeh (born 1969), singer, composer, pianist

Singers 

 Safi al-Din al-Urmawi (1216–1294), musician and writer on the theory of music
 Abd al-Qadir Maraghi (d. 1435), musician and artist
 Aghakhan Abdullayev (born 1950), mugham singer
 Emin Agalarov (born 1979), singer
 Fatma Mukhtarova (1893–1972), opera singer (mezzo-soprano), Honorary Artist of Georgia, and People's Artist of Azerbaijan
 Ahmed Agdamski (1884–1954), folk and opera singer
 Ogtay Aghayev (1935–2006), singer
 Franghiz Ahmadova (1928–2011), opera singer
 Shovkat Alakbarova (1922–1993), singer
 Sevda Alakbarzadeh (born 1977), jazz singer
 Dinara Aliyeva (born 1980), singer (soprano)
 Safura Alizadeh (born 1992), singer
 Rauf Atakishiyev (1925–1994), singer, pianist, singer–soloist and scholar
 Mashadibaba Aydamirov (1971–2011), meykhana performer
 Elchin Azizov (born 1975), opera singer and entertainer
 Rashid Behbudov (1915–1989), singer, actor
 Bulbul (1897–1961), folk and opera singer and one of the founders of Azerbaijani national musical theater
 Bulbuljan (1841–1927), mugham singer
 Polad Bulbuloglu (born 1945), singer-songwriter and actor
 Aghasalim Childagh (1930–2008), meykhana performer
 Brilliant Dadashova (born 1965), singer
 Rashad Daghly (born 1984), meykhana performer
 Huseyn Derya (1975–2014), rapper
 Jabbar Garyagdyoglu (1861–1944), mugham singer
 Eldar Gasimov (born 1989), singer and actor
 Fidan Gasimova (born 1947), opera singer
 Fidan Haciyeva (born 1976), opera singer
 Khuraman Gasimova (born 1951), opera singer
 Gulkhar Hasanova (1918–2005), opera singer
 Hajibaba Huseynov (1919–1993), mugham singer
 Mansum Ibrahimov (born 1960), mugham singer
 Lutfiyar Imanov (1928–2008), opera singer
 Akif Islamzade (born 1948), pop singer
 Flora Karimova (born 1941), pop music singer, civil rights activist, and People's Artist of Azerbaijan.
 Aygün Kazımova (born 1971), pop singer, actress
 Dilara Kazimova (born 1984), singer and actress
 Zeynab Khanlarova (born 1936), singer and politician
 Muslim Magomayev (1942–2008), opera, pop singer and composer
 Sakhavat Mammadov (1953–1991), folk and mugham singer
 Yagub Mammadov (1930–2002), mugham singer
 Nazakat Mammadova (1944–1981), folk and mugham singer
 Anar Nagilbaz (born 1974), rapper, actor
 Alim Qasimov (born 1957), mugham singer
 Farghana Qasimova (born 1979), mugham singer
 Nizami Ramzi (1947–1997), meykhana performer
 Gadir Rustamov (1935–2011), mugham singer
 Huseyngulu Sarabski (1879–1945), opera singer, composer, playwright, actor, producer and musician
 Adalet Shukurov (born 1966), singer
 Khan Shushinski (1901–1979), mugham singer
 Seyid Shushinski (1889–1965), mugham singer
 Aysel Teymurzadeh (born 1989), singer
 Elshad Xose (born 1979), rapper
 Eyyub Yaqubov (born 1965), singer
 Miri Yusif (born 1977), rapper and singer
 Sami Yusuf (born 1980)‚ singer-songwriter
 Aziza Mustafa Zadeh (born 1969), jazz singer and pianist
 Diana Hajiyeva (born 1989), singer-songwriter
 Namig Garachukhurlu (born 1978), singer-songwriter, meykhana, performer

Instrumental musicians 

 Habil Aliyev (1927–2015), kamancha player
 Farhad Badalbeyli (born 1947), pianist and composer
 Kamil Jalilov (1938–2022), oboe player
 Bahram Mansurov (1911–1985), tar player
 Shahin Novrasli (born 1977), jazz pianist
 Gurban Pirimov (1880–1965), tar player
 Sadigjan (1846–1902), tar player and the inventor of the Azerbaijani tar
 Alihan Samedov (born 1964), balaban player
 Isfar Sarabski (born 1989), jazz pianist
 Rain Sultanov (born 1965), saxophonist

Philosophers 
 Bahmanyar (d. 1066), philosopher and scholar, who is mainly known as one of the most prominent pupils of Avicenna (d. 1037)
 Seyid Yahya Bakuvi (1410–1462), philosopher
 Max Black (1909–1988), philosopher
 Salahaddin Khalilov (born 1952), philosopher
 Adil Asadov (born 1958), philosopher
 Zaid Orudzhev (born 1932), philosopher
 Heydar Huseynov (1908–1950), philosopher and academician

Politicians 

 Sultan Majid Afandiyev (1887–1938), politician and revolutionary
 Samad aga Agamalioglu (1867–1930), politician and revolutionary
 Ahmet Ağaoğlu (1869–1939), politician, publicist and journalist
 Ruhulla Akhundov (1897–1938), First Secretary of the Communist Party of Azerbaijan SSR
 Vali Akhundov (1916–1986), First Secretary of the Communist Party of Azerbaijan SSR
 Heydar Aliyev (1923–2003), First Secretary of the Communist Party of Azerbaijan SSR and President of Azerbaijan
 Ilham Aliyev (born 1961), President of Azerbaijan
 Mehriban Aliyeva (born 1964), politician and UNESCO Goodwill Ambassador
 Elnur M. Allahverdiyev (born 1978), entrepreneur and politician who is a Member of the National Assembly of Azerbaijan (VI convocation).
 Mahammad Asadov (1941–1991), politician
 Araz Azimov (born 1962), politician
 Kamran Baghirov (1933–2000), First Secretary of the Communist Party of Azerbaijan SSR
 Mir Jafar Baghirov (1896–1956), First Secretary of the Communist Party of Azerbaijan SSR
 Elmir Bagirov (born 1980), politician
 Govhar Bakhshaliyeva (born 1954), Vice Speaker of the Milli Majlis
 Abulfaz Elchibey (1938–2000), President of Azerbaijan
 Aslan bey Gardashov (1866–1920), politician
 Ismat Gayibov (1942–1991), politician, the Public Prosecutor General of Azerbaijan
 Rasul Guliyev (born 1947), politician
 Vafa Guluzade (1940–2015), diplomat, political scientist and specialist in conflict resolution
 Kamaladdin Heydarov (born 1961), politician and composer
 Mirza Davud Huseynov (1894–1938), Chairman of the Presidium of the Communist Party of Azerbaijan SSR and First Secretary of the Communist Party of the Tajik SSR
 Tofig Ismayilov (1933–1991), politician
 Mammad Yusif Jafarov (1885–1938), politician
 Ali Karimli (born 1965), politician
 Khalil Khasmammadov (1875–1947), politician and diplomat
 Fatali Khan Khoyski (1875–1920), politician, attorney, and one of the founding leaders of Azerbaijan Democratic Republic.
 Anar Mammadkhanov (1970–2011), politician and social activist
 Ziya Mammadov (born 1952), politician
 Elmar Mammadyarov (born 1960), politician
 Rasim Musabayov (born 1951), politician, political scientist and specialist in conflict resolution
 Gazanfar Musabekov (1888–1938), politician
 Imam Mustafayev (1910–1997), First Secretary of the Communist Party of Azerbaijan SSR
 Ayaz Mutalibov (1938–2022), First Secretary of the Communist Party of Azerbaijan SSR and the first President of Azerbaijan
 Eldar Namazov (born 1956), politician
 Sabit Orujov (1912–1981), politician
 Ganira Pashayeva (born 1975), politician, public activist, journalist and poet
 Mammed Amin Rasulzade (1884–1955), statesman, scholar, public figure and one of the founding leaders of Azerbaijan Democratic Republic
 Khosrov bey Sultanov (1879–1947), politician
 Ramil Usubov (born 1948), politician
 Abdurrahman Vazirov (1930–2022), First Secretary of the Communist Party of Azerbaijan SSR
 Mir Teymur Yaqubov (1904–1970), First Secretary of the Communist Party of Azerbaijan SSR
 Nasib Yusifbeyli (1881–1920), publicist, statesman and one of the founding leaders of Azerbaijan Democratic Republic

Political activists and leaders of rebellions 
 Meshadi Azizbekov (1876–1918), revolutionary, of the 26 Baku Commissars and one of the first Azeri–Marxists
 Khanlar Safaraliyev (1878–1907), oil field worker, trade unionist and revolutionary social democrat
 Mir Hasan Vazirov (1889–1918), socialist–revolutionary, of the 26 Baku Commissars

Scientists 

 Hasan Abdullayev (1918–1993), physicist, scientist and public official, President of the National Academy of Sciences of the Azerbaijan SSR.
 Rasim Alguliyev (born 1958), doctor of technical sciences, active member of Azerbaijan National Academy of Sciences
 Aminaga Sadigov (born 1962), doctor of technical sciences, professor, the head of the Office of Science and Education of the Presidium of ANAS
 Ahliman Amiraslanov (born 1947), oncologist, professor and Rector of Azerbaijan Medical University
 Hamid Arasly (1902–1983), literary critic
 Firuddin Babayev (1929–1987), pathologist
 Anvar Chingizoglu (born 1962), historian, ethnologist and genealogist
 Jeyhun Hajibeyli (1891–1962), ethnographer
 Ashraf Huseynov (1907–1981), mathematician, member of Azerbaijan National Academy of Sciences
 Mammadali Huseynov (1922–1994), archeologist
 Nadir Ibrahimov (1932–1977), astronomer
 Hamlet Isakhanli (born 1948), mathematician and poet, founder and president of Khazar University
 Dashgin Iskandarov (born 1965), oil scientist, businessman
 Ishag Jafarzadeh (1895–1982), one of the pioneers of Azerbaijan archaeology and ethnography
 Kerim Kerimov (1917–2003), rocket scientist, one of the founders of the Soviet space industry, and for many years a central figure in the Soviet space program
 Yusif Kerimov (1926–1997), electrical engineer, inventor and former head of the Azerenergy
 Firudin bey Kocharli (1863–1920), philologist, writer and literary critic
 Yusif Mammadaliyev (1905–1961), chemist, was the president of the National Academy of Sciences of the Azerbaijan SSR
 Leyla Mammadbeyova (1922–2006), first female Azerbaijani pathologist and the first female forensic medical expert
 Zaid Orudzhev (born 1932), philosopher
 Mirali Qashqai (1907–1977), geologist
 Arif Salimov (born 1956), mathematician
 Farman Salmanov (1931–2007), geologist
 Agabey Sultanov (1938–2007), psychiatrist, scholar and public activist
 Hajibey Sultanov (1921–2008), astronomer and former head of the Shamakhi Astrophysical Observatory
 Lotfi A. Zadeh (1921–2017), mathematician, electrical engineer, computer scientist, founder of the theory of fuzzy sets and fuzzy logic
 Anvar Gasimzade (1912–1969), architect, Honored Architect of the Azerbaijan SSR (1960), correspondent member of ANAS (1967), rector of Azerbaijan State Oil and Industry University (1962–1968).
 Aghakhan Aghabeyli (1904–1980), Azerbaijani scientist in the field of genetics and animal breeding, doctor of agricultural sciences, professor, corresponding member of the VASKhNIL (now RAAS - Russian Academy of Agricultural Sciences), honored worker of science of the Azerbaijan SSR. The founder of the doctrine of buffalo breeding.
 Lutfiyar Imanov (1922–1980), physicist, full member of the Azerbaijan Academy of Sciences (1976), pedagogue, Honored Scientist of the Azerbaijan SSR (1979).

Sports 

 Asgar Abdullayev (born 1960), footballer and football manager
 Namig Abdullayev (born 1971), wrestler and Olympic champion
 Parviz Abdullayev (born 1986), professional kickboxer
 Ruslan Abishov (born 1987), footballer
 Emin Aghayev (born 1973), footballer and football manager
 Kamran Aghayev (born 1986), footballer
 Rafael Aghayev (born 1985), karateka
 Emin Ahmadov (born 1986), wrestler
 Mashalla Ahmadov (born 1959), footballer
 Samir Alakbarov (born 1968), footballer
 Vugar Alakbarov (born 1981), boxer
 Ahmad Alasgarov (1935–2015), footballer and football manager
 Rauf Aliyev (born 1989), footballer
 Arif Asadov (born 1970), footballer and football manager
 Toghrul Asgarov (born 1992), wrestler and Olympic champion
 Irada Ashumova (born 1958), sports shooter
 Israfil Ashurly (born 1969), mountaineer
 Murad Ashurly (1973–2014), mountaineer
 Fuad Aslanov (born 1976), boxer
 Orhan Aydın (born 1989), basketballer
 Tofiq Bahramov (1925–1993), Azerbaijani linesman from 1966 World Cup final
 Rasim Başak (born 1980), basketball player
 Rovshan Bayramov (born 1987), wrestler
 Faig Garayev (born 1959), volleyball player and volleyball coach
 Vugar Gashimov (1986–2014), chess grandmaster
 Vali Gasimov (born 1968), footballer and football manager
 Natavan Gasimova (born 1985), volleyball player
 Ramil Guliyev (born 1990), sprinter
 Gurban Gurbanov (born 1972), footballer and football manager
 Mahmud Gurbanov (born 1973), footballer and football manager
 Boyukagha Hajiyev (born 1958), footballer and football manager
 Faiq Hasanov (born 1940), chess arbiter, coach and TV presenter
 Nazim Huseynov (born 1969), judoka and Olympic champion
 Yunis Huseynov (born 1965), footballer and football manager
 Ramin Ibrahimov (born 1978), judoka
 Shahin Imranov (born 1980), boxer
 Elchin Ismayilov (born 1982), judoka
 Isgandar Javadov (born 1956), footballer
 Vagif Javadov (born 1989), footballer
 Aygün Kazımova (born 1971), handball
 Sergey Kramarenko (1946–2008), footballer and football manager
 Rauf Mamedov (born 1988), chess grandmaster
 Shakhriyar Mamedyarov (born 1985), chess grandmaster
 Elnur Mammadli (born 1988), judoka and Olympic champion
 Aghasi Mammadov (born 1980), boxer
 Alakbar Mammadov (1925–2014), footballer
 Elkhan Mammadov (born 1982), judoka
 Fariz Mammadov (born 1980), boxer
 Ramiz Mammadov (born 1968), footballer and football manager
 Teymur Mammadov (born 1993), boxer
 Zemfira Meftahatdinova (born 1963), sport shooter and Olympic champion
 Aghasalim Mirjavadov (born 1947), footballer and football manager
 Rami Miron (born 1957), Israeli Olympic wrestler
 Olokhan Musayev (born 1979), athlete
 Oleg Panyutin (born 1983), athlete
 Nizami Pashayev (born 1981), weightlifter
 Zhala Piriyeva (born 2000), rhythmic gymnast
 Natali Pronina (born 1987), swimmer
 Teimour Radjabov (born 1987), chess grandmaster
 Jamal Rahimov (born 1987), equestrian
 Vidadi Rzayev (born 1967), footballer and football manager
 Rashad Sadygov (born 1982), footballer
 Vagif Sadygov (born 1959), footballer and football manager
 Sharif Sharifov (born 1988), wrestler and Olympic champion
 Samadagha Shikhlarov (1959–2021), footballer and football manager
 Mahir Shukurov (born 1982), footballer
 Nazim Suleymanov (born 1965), footballer and football manager
 Jeyhun Sultanov (born 1979), footballer
 Afag Sultanova (born 1987), judoka
 Zaur Tagizade (born 1979), footballer
 Kazbek Tuaev (born 1940), footballer and football manager
 Lala Yusifova (born 1996), rhythmic gymnast
 Ilham Zakiyev (born 1980), judoka

Writers 

 Chingiz Abdullayev (born 1959), best–selling detective writer
 Elchin Afandiyev (born 1943), writer and politician
 Ilyas Afandiyev (1914–1996), writer
 Mirza Fatali Akhundov (1812–1878), writer, educator, philosopher; founder of Azerbaijani drama
 Suleyman Sani Akhundov (1875–1939), playwright, journalist, children's author and teacher
 Sakina Akhundzadeh (1865–1927), first female playwright and dramatist of Azerbaijani literature
 Mammad Araz (1933–2004), poet
 Vidadi Babanli (born 1927), writer, dramatist and translator
 Banine (1905–1992), writer
 Yusif Vazir Chamanzaminli (1887–1943), writer
 Mirvarid Dilbazi (1912–2001), poet
 Fikrat Goja (1935–2021), poet
 Madina Gulgun (1926–1991), poet
 Shikhali Gurbanov (1925–1967), writer
 Mahammad Hadi (1879–1920), poet
 Abdurrahim bey Hagverdiyev (1870–1930), playwright, stage director, politician and public figure
 Mehdi Huseyn (1909–1965), writer
 Ali bey Huseynzade (1864–1940), writer, philosopher, doctor and the creator of the modern flag of Azerbaijan
 Almas Ildyrym (1907–1952), poet
 Hamlet Isakhanli (born 1948), poet, writer, mathematician, historian of science, philosophy and culture and educator
 Jafar Jabbarly (1899–1934), writer
 Ahmad Javad (1892–1937), poet and best known for composing Azerbaijan's national anthem
 Jafargulu agha Javanshir (1787–1866), poet and major–general
 Huseyn Javid (1882–1941), poet and playwright, founder of the progressive romanticism in Azerbaijani literature
 Nusrat Kasamanli (1946–2003), poet
 Heyran Khanim (1790–1848), poet
 Jalil Mammadguluzadeh (1866–1932), satirist and writer
 Afag Masud (born 1957), writer
 Mikayil Mushfig (1908–1939), poet
 Khurshidbanu Natavan (1832–1897), poet
 Kamran Nazirli (born 1958), writer, translator and dramatist
 Mammed Said Ordubadi (1872–1950), writer
 Baba Punhan (1948–2004), poet
 Nigar Rafibeyli (1913–1981), writer
 Natig Rasulzadeh (born 1949), writer
 Ramiz Rovshan (born 1946), writer
 Suleyman Rustam (1906–1989), poet
 Rasul Rza (1910–1981), writer
 Anar Rzayev (born 1938), writer, dramatist and film director
 Mirza Alakbar Sabir (1862–1911), poet
 Elchin Safarli (born 1984), novelist and journalist
 Abbas Sahhat (1874–1918), poet and dramatist
 Bahar Shirvani (1835–1883), poet
 Seyid Azim Shirvani (1835–1888), poet
 Ismayil Shykhly (1919–1995), writer
 Manaf Suleymanov (1912–2001), writer, translator and historian
 Khalil Rza Uluturk (1932–1994), poet
 Mehdigulu Khan Vafa (1855–1900), poet and lieutenant colonel
 Molla Panah Vagif (1717–1797), poet and vizier Karabakh Khanate and the founder of realism in Azerbaijani literature
 Bakhtiyar Vahabzadeh (1925–2009), poet
 Aliagha Vahid (1895–1965), poet
 Mirza Shafi Vazeh (1794–1852), poet
 Hashim bey Vazirov (1868–1916), writer, journalist and publisher
 Najaf bey Vazirov (1854–1925), novelist, playwright, theatrical figure and one of the founders of Azerbaijani theater
 Molla Vali Vidadi (1708–1809), poet
 Samad Vurgun (1906–1956), poet
 Gasim bey Zakir (1784–1857), poet
 Habibi (born 1470), poet
 Mirza Ali Khan La'li (1845–1907), writer, physician

Other notables 

 Rovshan Aliyev (1955–2002), criminalist
 Rena Effendi (born 1977), photographer
 Rahilya Geybullayeva (born 1961), literary researcher
 Enver Mamedov (born 1923), mass media manager
 Shirali Muslimov (1805–1973), supercentarian
 Hasan bey Zardabi (1837–1907), publicist and scholar
 Hamida Javanshir (1873–1955), Azerbaijani philanthropist and women's rights activist

Iran

Actors 
 Behrouz Vossoughi (born 1938), actor
 Mohammad Reza Golzar (born 1977), actor and singer 
 Rambod Javan (born 1971), actor

Artists 
 Aydin Aghdashloo (born 1940), painter
 Haydar Hatemi (born 1945), painter

Businessmen 
 Reza Zarrab (born 1984), businessman

Clergy 

 Haji-Mirza Hassan Roshdieh (born 1851), cleric, teacher, politician, and journalist. introduced some modern teaching methods in Iran, especially in teaching the alphabet.
 Mohammad-Taqi Ja'fari Islamic scholar and philosopher
 Muhammad Husayn Tabatabaei, Islamic scholar and philosopher
 Javad Gharavi Aliari (1935–2018), Twelver shi'a marja
 Abdolkarim Mousavi Ardabili (1926–2016), politician and Twelver shi'a marja
 Sadegh Khalkhali (1926–2003), hardline Shia cleric of the Islamic Republic
 Abul-Qassim Khoei (1899–1992), Twelver shi'a marja
 Fazel Lankarani (1931–2007), Twelver shi'a marja
 Ali Meshkini (1922–2007), cleric and politician
 Hassan Roshdieh (1851–1944), cleric and politician
 Mohammad Kazem Shariatmadari (1905–1986), Grand Ayatollah
 Allameh Tabatabaei (1903–1981), philosopher
 Abbas-Ali Amid Zanjani (1937–2011), hardliner theologian, politician and scholar
 Mousa Shubairi Zanjani (born 1928), Twelver shi'a marja

Filmmakers 
 Jafar Panahi (born 1960), filmmaker

Military 
 Mehdi Bakeri (1954–1985), mayor during Iran–Iraq War
 Javad Fakori (1939–1981), army general and politician
 Abbas Gharabaghi (1918–2000), politician, military leader of Iran and the first Iranian to successfully pilot an aircraft
 Habibullah Huseynov (1910–1945), Soviet colonel and Hero of the Soviet Union
 Mohammad Taqi–Khan Pessian (1892–1921), military leader
 Yahya Rahim Safavi (born 1958), Major General, Chief commander of IRGC (1997–2007)
 Mohammad Bagheri (born c. 1960/1961), Major General, Chief of the General Staff of the Armed Forces of the Islamic Republic of Iran (2016–present)

Musicians 

 Hossein Alizadeh (born 1951), classical composer and folk musician
 Arash (born 1977), singer, dancer, entertainer and producer
 Aref Arefkia (born 1941), singer
 Faegheh Atashin (born 1960), singer and actress
 Davod Azad (born 1963), composer, Sufi vocalist and multi–instrumentalist
 Samin Baghtcheban (1925–2008), musician, composer, author and translator
 Dariush Eghbali (born 1951), pop singer
 André Hossein (1905–1983), composer
 Aygün Kazımova (born 1971), pop singer
 Fatma Mukhtarova (1893–1972), opera singer
 Rubaba Muradova (1930–1983), mugham and folk singer
 Hassan Sattar (born 1949), pop singer

Monarchy 
 Farah Pahlavi, Queen of Iran
 Tadj ol-Molouk (1896–1982), Queen consort of Iran

Politicians 
 

 Gholam Reza Aghazadeh (born 1949), politician
 Mina Ahadi (born 1956), politician
 Mehdi Bazargan (1908–1995), politician
 Mahmudali Chehregani (born 1958), politician
 Piruz Dilanchi (born 1965), politician and poet
 Parviz Fattah (born 1961), politician
 Mir Bashir Gasimov (1879–1949), politician
 Ebrahim Hakimi (1863–1959), politician
 Mahmud Jam (1884–1969), politician
 Ali Khamenei (born 1939), President of Iran and Supreme Leader of Iran
 Sadegh Mahsouli (born 1959), politician
 Mohsen Mehralizadeh (born 1955), politician
 Reza Moridi (born 1945), politician
 Mir-Hossein Mousavi (born 1942), politician
 Ali Soheili (1896–1958), politician
 Amir Hatami (born 1965), defense minister of Iran

Revolutionaries 
 Bagher Khan (1870–1911), constitutional revolutionary leader
 Haydar Khan e Amo-oghli (1880–1921), revolutionary and politician
 Sattar Khan (1866–1914), constitutional revolutionary leader
 Mohammad Khiabani (1880–1920), revolutionary, cleric and politician
 Ja'far Pishevari (1893–1947), the founder and chairman of the socialist Azerbaijan People's Government

Scientists 

 Shahriar Afshar (born 1971), physicist and inventor
 Ali Murad Davudi (1922–1979), philosopher
 Ali Javan (1926–2016), physicist and inventor
 Ahmad Kasravi (1890–1946), linguist, historian, reformer, nationalist politician, author and philosopher
 Kazem Sadegh-Zadeh (born 1942), analytic philosopher

Sports 

 Hossein Reza Zadeh (born 1978), weightlifter and double Olympic champion
 Ali Daei (born 1969), footballer and coach
 Rahim Aliabadi (born 1943), wrestler
 Javad Allahverdi (born 1954), footballer
 Sajjad Anoushiravani (born 1984), weightlifter
 Karim Ansarifard (born 1990), footballer
 Aziz Asli (1938–2015), footballer
 Karim Bagheri (born 1974), footballer
 Cyrus Dinmohammadi (born 1970), footballer
 Parviz Ghelichkhani (born 1945), footballer
 Yahya Golmohammadi (born 1971), footballer
 Yousef Karami (born 1983), taekwondo athlete
 Rasoul Khatibi (born 1978), footballer
 Saeid Marouf (born 1985), volleyball setter of national team of Iran
 Purya Fayazi (born 1993), volleyball player of national team of Iran
 Mohammad Navazi (born 1974), footballer
 Ali Akbar Ostad-Asadi (born 1965), footballer
 Mohammad Paziraei (1929–2002), wrestler
 Hadi Saei (born 1976), taekwondo athlete and double Olympic and world champion
 Jafar Salmasi (born 1918), weightlifter
 Aboutaleb Talebi (born 1945), wrestler
 Kimia Alizadeh (born 1998), taekwondo athlete and Iran's first female Olympic medalist

Writers 

 Reza Baraheni (1926–2000), novelist, poet and politician
 Samad Behrangi (1939–1967), political writer
 Izzeddin Hasanoglu (13th–14th centuries), the founder of literature in Azerbaijani language
 Mirza Ibrahimov (1911–1993), writer, playwright, Chairman of the Presidium of the Supreme Soviet of Azerbaijan SSR (1954–1958)
 Naser Manzuri (born 1953), novelist and linguist
 Iraj Mirza (1874–1926), poet and politician
 Ali Mojuz (1873–1934), satirical poet
 Seyid Abulgasim Nabati (1812–1873), poet
 Ebrahim Nabavi (born 1958), political journalist, satirist
 Ali Nazem (1906–1941), poet, writer and literary critic
 Mir Jalal Pashayev (1908–1978), writer and literary critic, honored scientist of Azerbaijan SSR
 Bulud Qarachorlu (1926–1979), poet
 Khasta Qasim (1684–1760), poet
 Hassan Roshdieh (1851–1944), teacher, politician, and journalist
 Gholam Hossein Saedi (1936–1985), writer
 Mohammad Hossein Shahriar (1906–1988), poet
 Qovsi Tabrizi (1568–1640), poet

Other notables 
 Reza Deghati (born 1952), photographer
 Hassan Khosrowshahi (born 1940), businessman and philanthropist

Turkey

Actors 
 Nesrin Cevadzade (born 1981), actress
 Tamer Karadağlı (born 1967), actor
 Nevra Serezli (born 1944), actress
 Mehmet Karaca, actor

Literature 
 Ataol Behramoğlu (born 1942), poet, translator

Musicians 
 Edis Görgülü (born 1990), British-born Turkish singer of Azerbaijani origin
 Tuğba Ekinci (born 1976), pop singer
 Nuray Hafiftaş (born 1964), folk singer
 Cem Karaca (1945–2004), musician

Politicians 
 Sinan Oğan (born 1967), politician
 Kıznaz Türkeli (born 1968), politician
 Ahmet Ağaoğlu (1869–1939), politician and journalist

Sports 
 Vasıf Arzumanov (born 1988), wrestler
 Servet Çetin (born 1981), footballer
 Sinan Şamil Sam (born 1974), boxer
 Servet Tazegül (born 1988), taekwondo practitioner and Olympic champion

Other 
 Süreyya Ağaoğlu (1903–1989), first female lawyer in Turkey
 Acun Ilıcalı (born 1969), TV producer, entrepreneur and president of Hull City A.F.C.

Georgia

Military 
 Abdulhamid bey Gaytabashi (1884–1920), military general

Musicians 
 Rashid Behbudov (1915–1989), singer and actor
 Khadija Gayibova (1893–1938), first Azerbaijani female pianist
 Shovkat Mammadova (1897–1981), first Azerbaijani opera singer
 Niyazi (1912–1984), musical conductor and composer
 Abdulla Shaig (1881–1959), poet and writer

Politicians 
 Hasan Hasanov (born 1940), first Prime Minister of Azerbaijan
 Nariman Narimanov (1870–1925), politician, writer and Chairman of the Council of People's Commissars of the Azerbaijan SSR
 Alimardan Topchubashev (1862–1934), politician, foreign minister and Minister of External Affairs of Azerbaijan Democratic Republic (1918), Head of the Parliament in absentia of Azerbaijan Democratic Republic (1918–1920)
 Raul Usupov (1980–2005), politician
 Peri-Khan Sofiyeva (1884–1951), Georgian deputy of Azerbaijani origin, the first Muslim woman to become a deputy, deputy of the Democratic Republic of Georgia (1918-1920)

Sports 
 Farid Mansurov (born 1982), wrestler, Olympic champion
 Zabit Samedov (born 1984), kickboxer
 Ramila Yusubova (born 1989), judoka

Other notables 

 Dilara Aliyeva (1929–1991), women's rights activist and scholar
 Shamistan Alizamanli (born 1959), singer, poet and military speaker
 Govhar Gaziyeva (1887–1960), actress
 Hamlet Isakhanli (born 1948), mathematician, poet, social scientist, founder of Khazar University
 Geysar Kashiyeva (1929–1972), painter
 Nigar Shikhlinskaya (1871–1931), the first Azerbaijani nurse

Russia

Actors 
 Marziyya Davudova (1901–1962), actress
 Shafiga Mammadova (born 1945), film and theater actress
 Timur Rodriguez (born 1979), showman, singer and TV personality

Musicians 
 Asaf Zeynally (1909–1932), composer, founder of the romance in Azerbaijani music and Azerbaijani children's music

Politicians 
 Geydar Dzhemal (born 1947), philosopher, politician and social activist
 Georgiy Mamedov (born 1947), diplomat
 Tofig Zulfugarov (born 1959), politician

Sports 

 Tamilla Abassova (born 1982), Olympic silver medalist
 Emin Garibov (born 1990), artistic gymnast
 Ayaz Guliyev (born 1996), footballer
 Qadir Huseynov (born 1986), chess grandmaster
 Emin Mahmudov (born 1992), footballer
 Ramiz Mamedov (born 1992), footballer
 Aleksandr Samedov (born 1984), footballer
 Ramil Sheydayev (born 1996), footballer

Other notables 
 Habibullah Huseynov, Soviet colonel and Hero of the Soviet Union
 Chingis Izmailov (1944–2011), psychophysiologist
 Chingiz Mustafayev (1960–1992), journalist and disc jockey

Armenia

Artists 
 Mirza Kadym Irevani (1825–1875), ornamentalist artist and portraitist

Military 
 Etibar Hajiyev (1971–1992), soldier
 Habib bey Salimov (1881–1920), Major–General of Azerbaijan Democratic Republic

Musicians 
 Ashig Alasgar (1821–1926), poet and folk singer
 Said Rustamov (1907–1983), composer and conductor

Politicians 
 Ismat Abbasov (born 1954), politician
 Avaz Alakbarov (born 1952), politician and economist
 Aziz Aliyev (1896–1962), politician
 Ogtay Asadov (born 1955), politician
 Zulfi Hajiyev (1935–1991), politician
 Shahin Mustafayev (born 1965), politician
 Akbar agha Sheykhulislamov (1891–1961), politician

Scientists 
 Heydar Huseynov (1908–1950), philosopher
 Mammad agha Shahtakhtinski (1846–1931), linguist and politician
 Mustafa Topchubashov (1895–1981), surgeon and academician

Sports 
 Ramazan Abbasov (born 1983), footballer
 Samir Aliyev (born 1979), footballer
 Rovshan Huseynov (born 1975), boxer
 Khagani Mammadov (born 1976), footballer
 Vitaliy Rahimov (born 1984), wrestler

Writers 
 Farman Karimzade (1937–1989), writer, screenwriter and film director
 Hidayat Orujov (born 1944), writer and politician

Other notables 
 Huseyn Seyidzadeh (1907–1983), film director

United Kingdom 

 Elyar Fox (born 1995), singer, musician and songwriter
 Nigar Jamal (born 1980), singer
 Donald Swann (1923–1994), composer, musician and entertainer
 Sami Yusuf (born 1980), singer

United States 

 Nima Arkani-Hamed (born 1972), theoretical physicist
 Sona Aslanova (1924–2011), soprano singer
 Nik Caner-Medley (born 1983), basketball player
 Sibel Edmonds (born 1970), translator and founder of the National Security Whistleblowers Coalition
 Chingiz Sadykhov (1929–2017), pianist
 Norm Zada (born 1954), founder of Perfect 10 magazine

Other places

Belarus 
 Natik Bagirov (born 1964), judoka
 Leila Ismailava (born 1989), journalist
 Kamandar Madzhidov (born 1961), Olympic, world and European wrestling champion
 Rashad Mammadov (born 1974), judoka

Iraq 

 Fuzûlî (1494–1556), poet and thinker
 Nasimi (1369–1417), mystical poet
 Amel Senan (born 1966), actress

France 
 Robert Hossein (1927–2020), film actor, director, and writer
 Irène Mélikoff (1917–2009), turkologist

Hungary 
 Gábor Kubatov (born 1966), politician

Spain 
 Eddy Pascual (born 1992), footballer

Turkmenistan 
 Hajibala Abutalybov (born 1944), mayor of Baku
 Elnur Hüseynov (born 1987), singer
 Tahira Tahirova (1913–1991), politician

Ukraine 
 Oleh Babayev (1965–2014), politician and mayor of Kremenchuk
 Fatma Gadri (1907–1968), actress
 Pavlo Pashayev (born 1988), footballer

Uzbekistan 
 Stalic Khankishiev (born 1968), chef
 Movlud Miraliyev (born 1974), judoka

See also 
 List of companies of Azerbaijan
 Azerbaijani people
 Iranian Azerbaijanis

References

Notes

External links